Frank G. Rossetti (November 25, 1907 – November 6, 1992) was an American politician who served in the New York State Assembly from 1943 to 1944 and from 1955 to 1972.

He died of cancer on November 6, 1992, in Manhattan, New York City, New York at age 84. He is buried at Saint Raymond's Cemetery in the Bronx.

References

1907 births
1992 deaths
20th-century American politicians
Democratic Party members of the New York State Assembly
Burials at Saint Raymond's Cemetery (Bronx)
Politicians from Manhattan